Pierre-Antoine Mongin (1761 – 19 May 1827) was a French painter and engraver.

Mongin was the designer for the 1807 Zuber & Cie scenic wallpaper l'Hindoustan. In 2013 a part of his design for l'Hindoustan appeared on a postage stamp for the French Post.

His work is included in the permanent collections of the Art Institute of Chicago, the Cooper-Hewitt, Smithsonian Design Museum, and the Metropolitan Museum of Art.

Gallery

References

1761 births
1827 deaths
18th-century French painters
19th-century French painters
French designers